Dendropsophus jimi is a species of frog in the family Hylidae.
It is endemic to Brazil.
Its natural habitats are moist savanna, subtropical or tropical moist shrubland, subtropical or tropical high-altitude shrubland, rivers, swamps, freshwater springs, pastureland, rural gardens, ponds, and canals and ditches.
It is threatened by habitat loss.

References

jimi
Endemic fauna of Brazil
Amphibians described in 1999
Taxonomy articles created by Polbot